This list of the prehistoric life of Colorado contains the various prehistoric life-forms whose fossilized remains have been reported from within the US state of Colorado.

Precambrian
The Paleobiology Database records no known occurrences of Precambrian fossils in Colorado.

Paleozoic

Selected Paleozoic taxa of Colorado

 †Actinoceras
 †Aglaocrinus
 †Amorphognathus
 †Amplexus
 †Archaeocidaris
  †Astraspis – type locality for genus
 †Astraspis desiderata – type locality for species
 †Athyris
 †Aviculopecten
  †Calamites
 †Calamites cistii
 †Calamites cruciatus
 †Callipteris
 †Callipteris lyratifolia – or unidentified comparable form
 †Camarotoechia
  †Caninia
  †Catenipora
 †Ceraurinus
 †Charactoceras – tentative report
 †Chirognathus
  †Composita
 †Composita ovata
 †Conocardium
 †Cordaites
 †Cornulites
 †Crania
 †Ctenacanthus
 †Ctenacanthus buttersi
 †Ctenacanthus furcicarinatus
 †Cupressocrinites
  †Cutleria – type locality for genus
 †Cutleria wilmarthi – type locality for species
 †Cyclopteris
 †Cyrtogomphoceras
 †Cyrtospirifer
 †Cyrtospirifer animasensis
 †Cyrtospirifer whitneyi
 †Echinosphaerites – tentative report
  †Edestus
 †Endoceras
 †Eretmocrinus
  †Eryops
 †Euomphalus
 †Girvanella
 †Halysites
 †Isalaux – type locality for genus
 †Isonema
 †Kionoceras
 †Lambeoceras
 †Lepidodendron
 †Lepidostrobus
  †Limnoscelis
 †Lingula
  †Meristella
 †Neospirifer
 †Neospirifer goreii
  †Neuropteris
 †Neuropteris auriculata
 †Neuropteris gigantea – tentative report
 †Neuropteris heterophylla
  †Ophiacodon
 †Oradectes
 †Ormoceras
 †Orthoceras
 †Oulodus
 †Paladin – tentative report
 †Pecopteris
 †Pecopteris arborescens
 †Plaesiomys
 †Platyceras
  †Platyhystrix
 †Platyhystrix rugosus
 †Pugnax
 †Receptaculites
 †Samaropsis
 †Sandia
 †Seymouria
 †Sigillaria
 †Sigillaria elegans – or unidentified comparable form
 †Sphenophyllum
 †Sphenopteris
 †Spirifer
 †Spirifer centronatus
 Spirorbis
 †Spyroceras
 †Stigmaria
 †Strepsodiscus – type locality for genus
 †Strophomena
 †Syringopora
  †Taxocrinus
 †Walchia
 †Westonoceras

Mesozoic

Selected Mesozoic taxa of Colorado

 Acmaea
 †Adocus
 †Albanerpeton
 †Albanerpeton nexuosus
 †Albertosaurus – tentative report
   †Allosaurus – type locality for genus
 †Allosaurus fragilis – type locality for species
 †Amblotherium – type locality for genus
 Amia
  †Amphicoelias – type locality for genus
 †Amphicoelias altus – type locality for species
 †Amphicotylus
 †Amphicotylus lucasii – type locality for species
 †Anaklinoceras
 †Anisoceras
 †Anomia
  †Anomoepus – tentative report
 †Apateodus
 †Apatopus
  †Apatosaurus – type locality for genus
 †Apatosaurus ajax – type locality for species
 †Apatosaurus louisae – type locality for species
 †Arenicolites
 Aspideretes
 Astarte
 †Atlantosaurus
 †Atlantosaurus immanis – type locality for species
 †Axonoceras
  †Baculites
 †Baculites aquilaensis
 †Baculites asper
 †Baculites clinolobatus – type locality for species
 †Baculites codyensis
 †Baculites compressus
 †Baculites cuneatus
 †Baculites grandis
 †Baculites haresi
 †Baculites mclearni
 †Baculites meeki – type locality for species
 †Baculites reesidei
  †Barosaurus
  †Basilemys
 †Bison
 †Bison alticornis – type locality for species
 †Borealosuchus
 †Borealosuchus sternbergii
 †Brachauchenius – or unidentified comparable form
 †Brachiosaurus – type locality for genus
 †Brachiosaurus altithorax – type locality for species
 †Brachychampsa
 †Brachychampsa montana
 †Brachyphyllum
  †Brontosaurus
 †Brontosaurus excelsus
 †Brontosaurus yahnahpin
 †Calycoceras
  †Camarasaurus – type locality for genus
 †Camarasaurus grandis
 †Camarasaurus lewisi
 †Camarasaurus supremus – type locality for species
  †Camptosaurus – type locality for genus
 †Camptosaurus dispar – type locality for species
 Carcharias
 †Caririchnium
 †Cedrobaena
 †Ceratodus – type locality for genus
  †Ceratosaurus – type locality for genus
 †Ceratosaurus nasicornis – type locality for species
 Cerithiopsis
  †Champsosaurus
 Chara
 †Chelonipus
 †Chinlea
 †Chirotherium
 †Chirotherium lulli
 †Cimolichthys
 †Cimolichthys nepaholica
 †Cimolodon – or unidentified comparable form
  †Cimolomys
 †Cionodon – type locality for genus
 †Cionodon arctatus – type locality for species
 †Cirroceras
 †Clidastes
 †Coelophysis – tentative report
 †Coelurus
 †Coelurus fragilis
 †Compsemys
 †Coniasaurus
 Corbula
 †Crenella
 †Cretolamna
 †Cretolamna appendiculata
  †Cretoxyrhina
 †Cretoxyrhina mantelli
 Cucullaea
 Cuspidaria
  †Didymoceras
 †Didymoceras cheyennense
 †Didymoceras stevensoni
 †Dinehichnus
 †Dinochelys
  †Diplodocus – type locality for genus
 †Diplodocus lacustris – type locality for species
 †Diplodocus longus – type locality for species
 †Diplosaurus
 Discinisca
 †Discoscaphites
 †Discoscaphites conradi
 †Docodon
 †Dorsetisaurus
 †Dorsetochelys
 †Dryosaurus
 †Dryosaurus altus
  †Edmontonia
  †Edmontosaurus
 †Edmontosaurus regalis – type locality for species
 Eilenodon – type locality for genus
 †Elopopsis
 †Enchodus
 †Enchodus gladiolus – or unidentified comparable form
 †Enchodus shumardi – or unidentified comparable form
  †Equisetum
 †Eubrontes
 †Eubrontes giganteus
 †Eucalycoceras
 †Euomphaloceras
 †Eutrephoceras
 †Eutretauranosuchus – type locality for genus
 †Eutretauranosuchus delfsi – type locality for species
 †Exiteloceras
 †Exogyra
  †Fagesia
 Ficus
 †Forresteria
 †Fruitachampsa – type locality for genus
 †Fruitachampsa callisoni – type locality for species
 †Fruitadens – type locality for genus
 †Fruitadens haagarorum – type locality for species
 †Fruitafossor – type locality for genus
 †Fruitafossor windscheffeli – type locality for species
 †Galeamopus
 †Galeamopus pabsti
 †Glirodon
 †Glirodon grandis
 †Glyptops
  †Goniopholis
 †Grallator
 †Hallopus
 †Hallopus victor – type locality for species
  †Haplocanthosaurus – type locality for genus
 †Haplocanthosaurus delfsi – type locality for species
 †Haplocanthosaurus priscus – type locality for species
 †Hemicalypterus
  †Herrickiceras
 †Hoploscaphites
 †Hoploscaphites birkelundae
 †Hoploscaphites nicolletii
 †Hulettia – report made of unidentified related form or using admittedly obsolete nomenclature
 †Hypsirophus – type locality for genus
  †Ichthyodectes
 †Ignotornis – type locality for genus
  †Inoceramus
 †Inoceramus altus
 †Inoceramus altusiformis
 †Inoceramus anomalus
 †Inoceramus arnoldi
 †Inoceramus balticus
 †Inoceramus brancoiformis
 †Inoceramus bueltenensis
 †Inoceramus cordiformis
 †Inoceramus crippsi – or unidentified related form
 †Inoceramus deformis
 †Inoceramus erectus
 †Inoceramus flavus
 †Inoceramus grandis
 †Inoceramus longealatus
 †Inoceramus muelleri - or unidentified loosely related form
 †Inoceramus oblongus
 †Inoceramus pictus
 †Inoceramus prefragilis
 †Inoceramus rutherfordi – or unidentified comparable form
 †Inoceramus tenuistriatus – tentative report
 †Ischyrhiza
 †Ischyrhiza avonicola – or unidentified comparable form
  †Jeletzkytes
 †Jeletzkytes brevis
 †Jeletzkytes dorfi
 †Jeletzkytes nodosus
 †Kepodactylus – type locality for genus
 †Kepodactylus insperatus – type locality for species
 †Laosaurus – report made of unidentified related form or using admittedly obsolete nomenclature
  Lepisosteus – tentative report
 †Leptalestes – tentative report
 †Leptalestes cooki
 †Leptolepis – or unidentified comparable form
 Lima
 †Lingula
 †Lioestheria
 †Lisserpeton
 †Lisserpeton bairdi
 †Lonchidion
 †Lucina
  †Macelognathus
 †Magnoavipes
 †Marshosaurus – or unidentified comparable form
  †Meniscoessus
 †Meniscoessus collomensis – type locality for species
 †Meniscoessus robustus – or unidentified comparable form
 †Mesadactylus – type locality for genus
 †Mesadactylus ornithosphyos – type locality for species
 †Mesodma
 †Mesodma formosa – or unidentified comparable form
 †Mesojassoides – type locality for genus
 †Mesojassoides gigantea – type locality for species
 †Metoicoceras
 †Metoicoceras geslinianum
 †Micropycnodon
 †Modiolus
 †Morosaurus
 †Morrolepis
 †Myledaphus
 †Myledaphus bipartitus
  †Mymoorapelta – type locality for genus
 †Mymoorapelta maysi – type locality for species
 Myrica
 †Nanosaurus – type locality for genus
 †Nanosaurus agilis – type locality for species
 †Nanosaurus rex
  Natica
 †Neocardioceras
 †Neocardioceras densicostatum – type locality for species
 †Neocardioceras juddii
 †Neocardioceras laevigatum
 †Neocardioceras minutum
 †Neocardioceras uptonense
 †Neoptychites
  †Nostoceras
 †Nostoceras approximans – or unidentified comparable form
 †Nostoceras larimerense – type locality for species
 †Nostoceras monotuberculatum
 †Nostoceras obtusum – or unidentified comparable form
 †Nostoceras splendidum – or unidentified comparable form
 Nucula
 †Nucula percrassa
 †Odaxosaurus
 †Odaxosaurus piger
 †Opisthias
 †Opisthotriton
  †Ornitholestes – tentative report
 †Ornithomimipus
 †Ornithomimus – type locality for genus
 †Ornithomimus velox – type locality for species
 Ostrea
 †Othnielia – tentative report
  †Othnielosaurus
 †Othnielosaurus consors
 †Oxytoma
  †Pachycephalosaurus
 †Pachyrhizodus
 †Pachyrhizodus minimus
 †Palaeobalistum
 †Palaeopteryx – type locality for genus
 †Parabrontopodus – type locality for genus
 †Paramacellodus
 †Paressonodon – type locality for genus
 †Parikimys – type locality for genus
 †Parviraptor
 †Pentaceratops
 †Pentaceratops sternbergii
 †Pinna
 †Placenticeras
 †Placenticeras meeki
  †Platyceramus
 †Platyceramus ahsenensis
 †Platyceramus cycloides
 †Platyceramus mantelli - or unidentified loosely related form
 †Platyceramus platinus
 †Platyognathus
 †Plesiobaena
 †Polyonax – type locality for genus
 †Polyonax mortuarius – type locality for species
 †Preprismatoolithus
 †Priacodon
 †Priacodon fruitaensis – type locality for species
  †Prognathodon
 †Prognathodon overtoni
 †Prognathodon stadtmani – type locality for species
 Propeamussium
 †Protocardia
  †Protosphyraena
 Prunus
 †Pseudoperna
 †Pseudoperna congesta
 †Pseudotetrasauropus – tentative report
 †Pteraichnus
  †Ptychodus
 †Ptychodus anonymus
 †Ptychodus decurrens
 †Ptychodus occidentalis
 †Ptychodus whipplei
 Pycnodonte
 †Pycnodonte newberryi
 Rhinobatos
 †Rhinobatos incertus
 †Rosselia
 †Saurillodon
 †Scapherpeton
  †Scaphites
 †Scaphites binneyi
 †Scaphites depressus
 †Scaphites hippocrepis – or unidentified comparable form
 †Scaphites nodosus
 †Scoyenia
 †Selaginella
 †Semionotus
 †Sphenodiscus
 †Sphenodiscus pleurisepta
 Squalicorax
 †Squalicorax curvatus
 †Squalicorax falcatus
 †Squalicorax pristodontus
 †Squatirhina
 †Squatirhina americana
  †Stegosaurus – type locality for genus
 †Stegosaurus armatus – type locality for species
 †Stegosaurus stenops – type locality for species
 †Stegosaurus ungulatus
 †Stenomyti – type locality for genus
 †Stenomyti huangae – type locality for species
 †Stokesosaurus – or unidentified comparable form
  †Supersaurus – type locality for genus
 †Supersaurus vivianae – type locality for species
 Tellina
 †Tenea
 Teredo
  †Thalassomedon – type locality for genus
 †Thalassomedon hanningtoni – type locality for species
 †Theiophytalia – type locality for genus
 †Theiophytalia kerri – type locality for species
 †Therangospodus – or unidentified comparable form
 †Thescelosaurus
 †Titanosaurus
 †Titanosaurus montanus – type locality for species
  †Torosaurus
 †Torosaurus latus
 †Torvosaurus – type locality for genus
 †Torvosaurus tanneri – type locality for species
 †Treptichnus
 †Triceratops
 †Triceratops galeus – type locality for species
 †Triceratops horridus
 †Trinacromerum – or unidentified comparable form
 Turritella
  †Tylosaurus
 †Tylosaurus proriger
  †Tyrannosaurus
 †Tyrannosaurus rex
 †Vascoceras
 Viviparus
 †Volviceramus
 †Walteria – type locality for genus
 †Watinoceras
 †Watinoceras coloradoense – type locality for species
 †Websteria
 †Xiphactinus
 †Xiphactinus audax

Cenozoic

Selected Cenozoic taxa of Colorado

  Abies
 †Absyrtus
 †Acalles
 Abies
 †Absyrtus
 †Acalles
 Acer
 †Acilius
 Acris
 †Acrostichum
 †Adalia
 †Adelopsyche – type locality for genus
 †Adocus
 Aegialia
 †Aelurodon
  †Aepycamelus
 †Aepycamelus giraffinus
 †Aeshna
 Agabus
 †Agallia
 †Agathemera
 Agelaius
 †Agnotocastor
 Agrilus
 Agriotes
 †Agromyza
 †Agulla
 †Agulla protomaculata – type locality for species
  †Ailanthus
 †Aletodon
 Aleurites
 †Alforjas – tentative report
  †Allognathosuchus
 †Allophylus
 Altica
 †Alysia
 Amara
 †Amauropilio
 †Amblycorypha – tentative report
 †Amblyteles
 †Ambystoma
 †Ambystoma tigrinum
  †Amebelodon
 Amelanchier
 Amia
 †Ammophila
 †Ampelopsis
 †Amphechinus
 †Amphicerus
  †Amphicyon
 †Amphicyon galushai
 †Amphicyon ingens
  †Amphimachairodus
 †Anabrus
 Anas
 †Anasa
 †Anatis
 †Anchitherium
 Andrena
 †Andrias
 †Andricus
 †Anelaphus
 †Anemia
 †Angustidens
 Anisotoma
 †Anobium
 †Anomala
 †Anomalon
 Anser
 †Antas
 Anthaxia
 †Antherophagus
  †Anthidium
 †Anthidium exhumatum – type locality for species
 †Anthidium scudderi – type locality for species
 †Anthomyia
 Anthonomus
 †Anthophora
 Antilocapra
 †Antilocapra americana
 †Antocha
  Aphaenogaster
 †Aphaenogaster donisthorpei – type locality for species
 †Aphaenogaster mayri – type locality for species
  †Aphelops
 Aphodius
 Aphrophora
 Apion
 †Apolysis
 Aquila
 †Aquila chysaetos
 Araneus
 †Archaeotherium
  †Archimyrmex – type locality for genus
 †Archimyrmex rostratus – type locality for species
 †Archiponera – type locality for genus
 †Archiponera wheeleri – type locality for species
  †Arctocyon
 †Argia
 †Arhopalus
 †Aristolochia
 †Artocarpus
 †Asimina
 Asio
 †Asplenium
 †Aster
 †Astronium
 Ataenius
 †Athalia
  †Athous
 †Athyana
 †Attagenus
 †Auraria – type locality for genus
 Aythya
 †Aythya affinis
 †Aythya americana
 †Aztlanolagus
 †Baena
 †Baris
  †Barylambda
 †Bassus
 †Bathornis – type locality for genus
 †Bathornis veredus – type locality for species
 †Bathygenys
  †Bathyopsis
 †Belyta
 Bembidion
 †Bembidion constricticolle
 †Bembidium
 †Beris
 Betula
 Bibio
 †Bibiodes
 †Bidessus
 Bison
 †Bison antiquus – or unidentified comparable form
  †Bison latifrons
 †Blechnum
 Bledius
 Boletina
  †Borealosuchus
 †Borophagus
 †Borophagus pugnator
 †Brachinus
  †Brachycrus
 Brachylagus
 †Brachyprotoma
 †Brachyprotoma obtusata
 †Brachypsalis
  †Brachyrhynchocyon
 †Brachyspathus – type locality for genus
 Bracon
 †Bruchus
 Bubo
 †Bubo virginianus
 Bufo
 †Bufo cognatus
 †Bufo woodhousei
 †Buprestis
 †Bursera
  Buteo
 †Caesalpinia
 †Calcarius
 †Calcarius lapponicus
 †Calcarius ornatus
 †Calippus
 †Caliroa
 †Callimoxys
 †Callomyia – tentative report
 Calosoma
 †Calyptapis – type locality for genus
 †Calyptapis florissantensis – type locality for species
  †Camelops
 †Camelops hesternus
 Camponotus
 Canis
 †Canis edwardii – or unidentified comparable form
  †Canis latrans
 †Cantius
 †Cantius abditus
 †Cantius frugivorus
 †Cantius mckennai
 †Cantius ralstoni
 †Capnobotes
 †Capsus
  Carabus
 †Cardiophorus
 †Cardiospermum
 †Carpocyon
 Carpodacus
 †Carpodacus cassinii
 †Carpophilus
  Carya
 Castanea
 †Catopsalis
 †Catopsalis alexanderi – type locality for species
 †Cecidomyia – tentative report
 Cedrela
 †Celastrus
 Celtis
 †Centron – type locality for genus
 †Ceratina
  †Ceratosuchus – type locality for genus
 †Ceratosuchus burdoshi – type locality for species
 †Ceraturgus
 Cercidiphyllum
 Cercis
 †Cercocarpus
 †Cercopis
 Cervus
 †Cervus elaphus
 Ceutorhynchus
 Chaetodipus
 †Chaetodipus hispidus
 †Chalcis
 †Chalybion
 †Chamaecyparis
  †Chamaedorea
 Charina
 †Chauliognathus
 Cheilosia
 †Chelonus
 †Chilocorus
 †Chionaemopsis – type locality for genus
 Chironomus
 Chondestes
 †Chondestes grammacus
 †Chriacus
 †Chrysis
 †Chrysobothris
 †Chrysogaster
 Chrysomela
 †Cicada
 †Cicadella
 †Cimbex
  †Cimexomys
 †Cimexomys arapahoensis – type locality for species
 †Cimexomys minor
  Cinnamomum
 Cissus
 †Cixius – tentative report
 †Cladius
 †Cladura
 †Clastoptera
 †Cleonus
 †Closterocoris
 †Closterocoris elegans – type locality for species
 †Clubiona
 †Clytus
 †Coccinella
 †Coeliodes
 Colaptes
  †Colaptes auratus
 †Colaspis
 †Collops
 †Colopterus
 †Colubrina
 †Compsemys
 †Coniatus
 Conotelus
 †Conotelus obscurus
 †Conotrachelus
 †Conzattia
 †Copecion
 †Copelemur
 †Copidita
 Corixa
 †Corizus
  †Cormocyon
 †Cormohipparion
 Cornus
 Corticaria
 Corvus
 †Corvus brachyrhynchos
 †Corvus corax
 †Corylus
  †Coryphodon
 Cossonus
 †Cotinus
 †Crabro
 †Cratacanthus
  Crataegus
 Crotalus
 †Crotalus viridis
 †Croton
 †Cryptocephalus
 †Cryptocheilus
 Cryptophagus
 Cryptorhynchus
 †Cryptus
  Culex
 †Curculio
 †Cuterebra
 †Cyclotrachelus
 †Cydamus
 †Cylindrotoma
  †Cynarctoides
 †Cynarctoides acridens
 †Cynelos
  Cynomys
 †Cyphomyia
 †Cypris
 †Daphne
 Daphnia
  †Daphoenus
 †Davidia
 †Denaeaspis – type locality for genus
 †Denaeaspis chelonopsis – type locality for species
 †Dennstaedtia
 †Dermatobia
 †Dermestes
 †Diabrotica
 †Diacodexis
 †Dialysis
 Diamesa
 †Dianthidium
  †Diceratherium
 †Dicerca
 Dicranomyia
 †Dicranota
 †Dictyla
 †Didymictis
 †Didymosphaeria
 †Dilophodon
  †Dinictis
  †Dinohippus
 †Dioctria
 Dioscorea
 †Diploptera
 Diplotaxis – tentative report
 Diplotaxis
 Dipodomys
 †Dipodomys ordii
 Dipteronia
 †Dissacus
 †Docimus – type locality for genus
 Dodonaea
  Dolichoderus
 †Dolichoderus antiquus – type locality for species
 †Dolichoderus kohlsi – type locality for species
 †Dolichoderus rohweri – type locality for species
 †Dominickus – type locality for genus
 †Dominickus castnioides – type locality for species
 †Domnina
 Donacia
 Dorytomus
 †Doxocopa
 †Drassonax
  †Dromomeryx
 †Dromomeryx borealis – type locality for species
 †Dryobius
 Dryopteris
 Dyschirius
 †Dysdercus
 †Echmatemys
 †Ectobius
 †Ectocion
  †Ectoconus
 †Elaeomyrmex – type locality for genus
 †Elaeomyrmex coloradensis – type locality for species
 †Elaeomyrmex gracilis – type locality for species
 †Elaphidion
 Elaphropus
 †Elater
 Eleodes
 †Emiliana – type locality for genus
 †Emiliana alexandri – type locality for species
 †Empis
 †Enallagma
 Engelhardtia
 Enochrus
 †Entimus
  †Eobasileus
 †Eobasileus cornutus
 †Eocuculus – type locality for genus
 †Eogryllus
  †Eohippus
 †Eohippus angustidens
 †Eosacantha – type locality for genus
 †Eosacantha delocranioides – type locality for species
  †Eotitanops
 Ephedra
 †Ephemera
 †Epicaerus
 Epicauta
  †Epicyon
 †Epicyon haydeni
 †Epihippus
 Epuraea
 †Epyris
 †Equisetum
 Equus
 †Equus conversidens
 †Equus francisci
  †Equus scotti – or unidentified comparable form
 †Equus simplicidens
 Eremophila
 †Eremophila alpestris
 Erethizon
 Eriocampa
 †Eriophyes – tentative report
 †Eristalis
 †Ernobius
 †Ethmia
 †Eubazus
 †Eucnemis
 †Eucommia
 Eugenia
  †Eulithomyrmex – type locality for genus
 †Eulithomyrmex rugosus – type locality for species
 †Eulithomyrmex striatus – type locality for species
 †Euparius
 Euphorbia
 †Eurytoma
 Eutamias
 †Eutamias minimus – or unidentified comparable form
 †Exochus
 Fagus
 Falcipennis
 Falco
 †Falco sparverius
 Ficus
  †Florissantia – type locality for genus
 †Florissantoraphidia funerata – type locality for species
 Formica
 †Fornax
 †Fraxinus
 †Fulgora
 †Fulica
 †Fulica americana
 †Gaurotes
 †Geocoris
 Geomys
 †Geomys bursarius
 †Geron – tentative report
 Gerris
 †Gigantocamelus
 †Glossina – type locality for genus
  Glyptostrobus
 Gnophomyia
 †Gomphocerus
  †Gomphotherium
 †Gorytes
 †Grammoptera
 †Gyaclavator – type locality for genus
 †Gyaclavator kohlsi – type locality for species
 †Gymnopternus
 †Gymnorhinus
 †Hadrianus
 Halesia
  †Hapalodectes
 †Haplolambda
 Harpalus
 †Helaletes
 †Helichus
 †Hellwigia
 Helophorus
 †Hemiauchenia
 †Hemiauchenia macrocephala
  †Heptodon
 †Heriades
  †Herpetotherium
 †Herpetotherium fugax
 †Herpetotherium knighti
 Hersiliola
 †Hesperocyon
 Heterodon
 †Heterodon nasicus
 †Hexerites – type locality for genus
 †Hexerites primalis – type locality for species
 †Heyderia
 Holbrookia
 †Holbrookia maculata
 †Holcorpa – type locality for genus
 †Holcorpa maculosa – type locality for species
  †Homogalax
 †Hoplia
 †Hoplocampa
 †Hoplochelys
 †Humulus
  †Hyaenodon
 †Hyaenodon crucians
 †Hyaenodon horridus
 †Hyaenodon mustelinus
 †Hydnobius
 Hydrangea
 Hydriomena
 †Hydriomena? protrita – tentative report
 Hydrobius
 †Hydrobius fuscipes
 †Hydromystria
 Hydrophilus
 Hydroporus
 Hydropsyche
 †Hydroptila
  Hygrotus
 †Hylobius
 †Hymenophyllum
  †Hyopsodus
 †Hypertragulus
 †Hypisodus
  †Hypohippus
 †Hypolagus
 †Hyporhina
 †Hyporhina galbreathi – type locality for species
 †Hyrachyus
  †Hyracodon
 †Hyracotherium
 †Hyracotherium vasacciense
 †Ichneumon
 Ilex
 †Indusia
 †Iridomyrmex
 †Iridomyrmex florissantius – type locality for species
 †Iridomyrmex obscurans – type locality for species
  †Ischyromys
 †Isomira
 †Isothea – type locality for genus
 †Isotrilophus
 †Iulus
 †Jadera
 †Janus
 Jassus – tentative report. Lapsus calami of Iassus.
 †Judolia
 †Judolia antecurrens – type locality for species
  Juglans
 Junco
 †Junco hyemalis
 †Juncus
 †Kalmia
 †Kimbetohia
 Koelreuteria
 †Lacon
 †Lagopus
 †Lagopus leucurus
 †Lambdotherium
 †Lapton
  Larus
 Lasiopodomys
 Lasius
 Lathrobium
 Laurus
 †Lebia
 †Leia
 †Lema
 Lemmiscus
 †Lemmiscus curtatus
 Lepisosteus
  †Leptauchenia
 †Leptis
 †Leptocyon
  †Leptomeryx
 †Leptomorphus
 Leptophloeus
 †Leptostylus
 †Leptura
 Lepus
 †Lepus townsendii
 †Leucosticte
 †Leucosticte atrata
 †Leucosticte tephrocotis
 †Leucozona
 †Ligyrocoris
 †Ligyrus
  †Limnephilus
 †Limnobium
 †Limnophila
 †Limonius
 Lindera
 †Linnaea – type locality for genus
 †Linyphia
  †Liometopum
 †Liometopum miocenicum – type locality for species
 †Liometopum scudderi – type locality for species
 †Lithocharis
  †Lithodryas – type locality for genus
 †Lithodryas styx – type locality for species
 †Locusta
 Lomatia
 Longitarsus
 Lontra
 †Lontra canadensis – or unidentified comparable form
 †Lucanus
 †Lycosa
 †Lygaeus
 Lygodium
 Lynx
 †Lynx rufus
 Lytta
  Macrocranion
 †Macrodactylus
 †Macrophya
 †Macrorhoptus
 Magdalis
 Magnolia
 Mahonia
 †Maiorana
 †Malachius
 †Malus
 †Mammuthus
  †Mammuthus columbi
 Marmota
 †Marmota flaviventris
 Martes
  †Megacerops
 Megachile
 †Megacyllene
 †Megahippus
 †Megalictis
 †Megapenthes
 †Megatylopus
 †Melanactes
 †Melanophila
 †Melieria
 †Melittomma
 †Mellinus
 Melospiza
 †Melospiza lincolnii
 †Meniscotherium
  †Menoceras
 Mephitis
 †Mephitis mephitis
  †Merychippus
 †Merychippus sejunctus
 †Merychyus
 †Merycochoerus
 †Merycodus
 †Merycoidodon – type locality for genus
 †Mesatirhinus
 †Mesochorus
  †Mesocyon
 †Mesodma
 †Mesodma hensleighi
 †Mesohippus
 †Mesoleptus
 †Mesonyx
 †Mesonyx obtusidens
 †Mesostenus
 Messor
  †Metacheiromys
 Metachroma
 †Metarhinus
 Metasequoia
 †Metasequoia occidentalis
  †Miacis
 Miagrammopes
 †Michenia
 †Microplitis
 †Microsyops
 †Microtomarctus
 Microtus
  †Microtus californicus – or unidentified comparable form
 †Microtus longicaudus
 †Microtus ochrogaster
 †Mimoperadectes
 †Mindarus – type locality for genus
  †Miniochoerus
 †Miodytiscus – type locality for genus
 †Miohippus
  †Miomyrmex
 †Miomyrmex impactus – type locality for species
 †Miomyrmex striatus – type locality for species
  †Miracinonyx
 †Miracinonyx inexpectatus – or unidentified comparable form
 †Miracinonyx studeri
 †Monosaulax
 Mordella
 †Mordella atrata – or unidentified comparable form
 †Mordella lapidicola – type locality for species
 †Mordella priscula – type locality for species
 †Mordella stygia – type locality for species
 Mordellistena
 †Mordellistena florissantensis – type locality for species
 †Mordellistena nearctica – type locality for species
 †Mordellistena scudderiana – type locality for species
 †Mordellistena smithiana – type locality for species
  †Moropus
 Morus
 Musca
 Mustela
 †Mustela richardsonii
  †Mustela nigripes
 †Myas
 †Mycetophagus
 Mycetoporus
 Myrica
 Myrmica
 Nebria
 †Nemognatha
 †Neoliotomus
 †Neoliotomus conventus
 †Neoliotomus ultimus
 Neogale
 Neogale frenata
 Neogale vison
 Neotoma
 †Neotoma cinerea
 †Nepa
 †Nephila
 †Netelia
 †Nicocles
  †Notharctus
 †Notharctus robustior
 Notonecta
 Numenius
 †Numenius madagascariensis
 †Numitor – type locality for genus
 †Nyctea
 †Nyctea scandiaca
  Nymphaea
 Nysius
 †Nyssa
 Ochotona
 †Ochotona princeps
 †Odaxosaurus – or unidentified comparable form
 †Odaxosaurus piger
 Odocoileus
  †Odocoileus hemionus
 †Odynerus
 †Oedipoda
 †Ogygoptynx – type locality for genus
 †Oligoaeschna – type locality for genus
 †Oligomerus
 †Oligotricha
 Omalium
 Omus
 Ondatra
 †Oodectes
 Ophisaurus
 Ophryastes
 †Ophyra
 †Opisthotriton
 †Orchelimum
 Orchestes
 Oreamnos – or unidentified comparable form
  †Oreamnos harringtoni
 †Oreopanax
  †Orohippus
 †Orontium
 †Orphilus
 †Orthocentrus
 †Osmanthus
 †Osmunda
 †Osmunda greenlandica
 †Otiorhynchus
 Ovis
  †Ovis canadensis
 †Oxyacodon
  †Oxyaena
 †Oxycera
 †Oxyomus
 †Pachyaena
 †Paederus
 †Palaeogale
 †Palaeolagus
 †Palaeonictis
 †Palaeosinopa
 †Palaeospiza bella
  †Palaeosyops – type locality for genus
  †Palaeovespa – type locality for genus
 †Palaeovespa florissantia – type locality for species
 †Palaeovespa gillettei – type locality for species
 †Palaeovespa relecta – type locality for species
 †Palaeovespa scudderi – type locality for species
 †Palaeovespa wilsoni – type locality for species
 †Palatobaena
 †Panax
 †Panorpa
 †Paracynarctus
 †Parahippus
 †Parahippus leonensis – or unidentified comparable form
  †Paramylodon
 †Paramylodon harlani
 †Paramys
 †Parandra
 †Paratylopus
 †Parectypodus
 †Parectypodus lunatus
 †Parictis
 †Parthenocissus
 †Passaloecus
 †Patriofelis
 Pediacus
 Pekania
 †Pellea
  †Peltosaurus
 †Peltosaurus granulosus – type locality for species
 †Pelycodus
 †Pelycodus danielsae
 †Pelycodus jarrovii
 Penthetria – type locality for genus
 †Pepsis
 †Peraceras
 †Peratherium
 Peromyscus
 †Peromyscus maniculatus
 Persea
  †Petraeomyrmex – type locality for genus
 †Petraeomyrmex minimus – type locality for species
 †Phaca
 Phalacrocorax
 Phalaropus
 †Phalaropus lobatus
 †Phasmagyps – type locality for genus
 Pheidole
  †Phenacodus
 Phenacomys
 †Phenacomys intermedius
 Philadelphus
 †Philanthus
  †Phlaocyon
 Phloeosinus
 †Phora
 Phryganea
 Phrynosoma
 †Phrynosoma douglassi
 †Phylledestes – type locality for genus
 †Phylledestes vorax – type locality for species
 †Phyllobaenus
 Phyllobius
 †Phyllophaga
 †Phymatodes
 Pica
 †Pica hudsonia
 Picea
 Picoides
 †Picoides villosus
 †Pidonia
 †Pimpla
 Pinus
 †Pipiza
 †Pison
 Pituophis
  †Pituophis melanoleucus
 Platanus
 Plateumaris
 †Platycheirus
 Platydema
  †Platygonus
 Platynus
 Platystethus
 Plecia
  †Plesiadapis
 †Plesiobaena
  †Pliohippus
 †Plochionus
 †Poabromylus
 Podabrus
 Podiceps
 Podilymbus
 †Podilymbus podiceps
  †Poebrotherium
 †Poecilocapsus
 †Poecilognathus – type locality for genus
 †Pogonomyrmex
 †Pogonomyrmex fossilis – type locality for species
 †Polysphincta
 Populus
 Porzana
 †Porzana carolina
 †Potamogeton
 †Praepapilio – type locality for genus
 †Praepapilio colorado – type locality for species
 †Praepapilio gracilis – type locality for species
 †Priabona
 †Pristichampsus
 †Probathyopsis
 †Procas
  †Prodryas – type locality for genus
 †Prodryas persephone – type locality for species
 †Proiridomyrmex – type locality for genus
 †Proiridomyrmex vetulus – type locality for species
 †Prolimnocyon
 †Proscalops
 Prosopis
  †Protazteca – type locality for genus
 †Protazteca capitata – type locality for species
 †Protazteca elongata – type locality for species
 †Protazteca hendersoni – type locality for species
 †Protazteca quadrata – type locality for species
 †Protohippus
 †Protolabis
 †Protomarctus
  †Protorohippus
 †Protostephanus – type locality for genus
 †Protostephanus ashmeadi – type locality for species
 †Protungulatum
 †Protungulatum donnae
 Prunus
 †Prunus gracilis
 †Psephenus
 Pseudacris
 †Pseudacris triseriata
  †Pseudaelurus
 †Pseudhipparion
 Pseudomyrmex
 †Pseudoprotoceras
 †Psittacotherium
 Ptelea
 Pterocarya
 †Pteromalus
 Pterostichus
  †Ptilodus
 †Ptilodus kummae
 †Ptosima
 Quedius
 Quercus
 Rallus
 †Rallus limicola
 †Ramoceros
 †Rallus
 †Rallus limicola
  †Ramoceros
 †Rana
 †Rana catesbeiana
 †Raphidia
 Reithrodontomys
 Reticulitermes
 Rhabdomastix
 †Rhagio
 Rhagonycha
 †Rhamnus
 †Rhamphomyia
  Rhineura
 †Rhingia
 Rhizophagus
 Rhus
 †Rhyssa
 †Ribes
 †Robinia
 †Rogas
 Rosa
 †Rothschildia
 Rubus
 Sabal
 †Saccoloma
 Salix
 †Sambucus
  †Saniwa
 †Saperda
 †Saperda florissantensis – type locality for species
 †Sapindus
 †Sapromyza
 Sassafras
  †Sassafras hesperia
 Scaphinotus
 Sceloporus
 †Sceloporus undulatus
 Sciara
 †Sciophila
 Sciurus
 Scolytus
 †Segestria
 †Selaginella
 †Semanotus
 Sequoia
  †Sequoia affinis
 Serica
 †Sespia
 †Sialia
 †Sibinia
 †Sifrhippus
 Sigmodon
 †Silpha
 †Silvius
 †Sinonyx – or unidentified comparable form
 Sitona
 †Sitones
 Sitta
 †Sitta carolinensis
 †Smilax
  †Smilodectes
 †Smilodectes gracilis
 †Smilodectes mcgrewi
 Sonoma
 Sorex
 †Sorex arcticus
 †Sorex hoyi
 †Sparganium
 Spea
 †Spea bombifrons
 †Spermophagus
 Spermophilus
 †Spermophilus elegans – or unidentified comparable form
 †Spermophilus lateralis
  †Spermophilus richardsonii
 †Spermophilus tridecemlineatus
 †Sphegina
  †Sphenocoelus
 Spilogale
 †Spilogale putorius
 Spizella
 †Spizella breweri
 †Staphylea
 Staphylinus
 †Stenolophus
 †Stenosphenus
 Stenus
 Sterculia
 Stilbus
 †Stipa
 †Strategus
  †Stylinodon
  †Subhyracodon
 Sylvilagus
 †Sylvilagus audubonii
 †Symphoromyia
 Syrphus
 †Systena
 †Tabanus
 Tachycineta
 †Tachycineta bicolor
 Tachyporus
 †Tachys
 Tamiasciurus
 †Tamiasciurus hudsonicus
 †Tanysphyrus lemnae
 Tapirus
 Taxidea
 †Taxidea taxus
 †Teilhardina
  †Teleoceras
 †Tenor – type locality for genus
 †Tenthredo
 †Tetragnatha
 †Tetraonyx
 †Tetraopes
 †Tetraopes submersus – type locality for species
 †Tetrapus
 Thamnophis
  †Thamnophis elegans
 †Thamnophis sirtalis
 †Thanasimus
 †Themira
 †Thomisus
 Thomomys
 †Thomomys talpoides
 †Thouinia
 †Thuja
  †Ticholeptus
 Tilia
 †Tingis
 Tipula – type locality for genus
 †Titanoeca
  †Titanoides
 †Titanoides looki
 †Titanoides primaevus
 †Tomarctus
 †Tomarctus brevirostris – type locality for species
 †Tomoxia
 †Tomoxia inundata – type locality for species
 †Torreya
 †Tortricites
 †Tortrix
 †Tortrix florissantana – type locality for species
 †Torymus
 Trechus
 †Trichilia
 †Triga
  †Trigonias
 †Trigonoscuta
 †Triplax
 †Tritemnodon
 †Triumfetta
 †Trixoscelis
  †Trogosus
 Trogoxylon
 †Trogus
 †Tropisternus
 Trox
 †Trypherus
 †Tryphon
 †Tychius
 Typha
 †Uintacyon
 †Uintascorpio – type locality for genus
 Ulmus
 †Ulus
 Urocyon
  †Urocyon cinereoargenteus
 †Ursavus
 Ursus
  †Ursus americanus
 †Ustatochoerus
 †Vanessa
 †Vauquelinia
 †Viburnum
 †Vicia
 †Villa – type locality for genus
 Vitis
 †Viverravus
 †Vrilletta
  †Vulpavus
 Vulpes
 †Vulpes velox
 †Vulpes vulpes
 †Weinmannia
 †Woodwardia
 †Xantholinus
 †Xestobium
  †Xylocopa
 †Xylomya
 †Xyronomys
 †Yumaceras
 †Zamia
 Zelkova
 Zizyphus
 Zonotrichia
 †Zonotrichia leucophrys
 †Zootermopsis
  †Zygolophodon

References
 

Colorado
Colorado-related lists